Agonopterix tschorbadjiewi is a moth of the family Depressariidae. It is found in Bulgaria.

The wingspan is about 25 mm.

References

Moths described in 1916
Agonopterix
Moths of Europe